Chrysallidinae is a taxonomic group of very small sea snails, marine gastropod mollusk in the family Pyramidellidae, the pyrams and their allies.

Taxonomy 
Chrysallidinae has been one of eleven recognized subfamilies of the gastropod family Pyramidellidae (according to the taxonomy of Ponder & Lindberg 1997). (The other 10 subfamilies are Odostomiinae, Turbonillinae, Cingulininae, Cyclostremellinae, Sayellinae, Syrnolinae, Eulimellinae, Pyramidellinae, Odostomellinae and Tiberiinae.)

According to Schander, Van Aartsen & Corgan (1999) there are 47 genera in this subfamily, four additional genera may also be a part of this taxon.

In the taxonomy of Bouchet & Rocroi (2005), this subfamily has been downgraded to the rank of tribe Chrysallidini in the subfamily Odostomiinae.

Genera
Genera in the subfamily Chrysallidinae include:
 Chrysallida Carpenter, 1856  - type genus
 Babella Dall, & Bartsch, 1906
 Bartrumella Laws, 1940
 Besla Dall & Bartsch, 1904
 Boonea Robertson, 1978
 Egila Dall, & Bartsch, 1904
 Euparthenia Thiele, 1929
 Eupyrgulina Melvill, 1910
 Eurathea Laseron, 1959
 Evalina Dall & Bartsch, 1904
 Fargoa Bartsch, 1955
 Folinella Dall, & Bartsch, 1904
 Gurmatia Dance & Eames, 1966
 Haldra Dall, & Bartsch, 1904
 Helodiamea Peñas & Rolán, 2017 
 Hinemoa Oliver, 1915
 Iolaea A. Adams, 1867
 Ivara Dall & Bartsch in Arnold, 1903

 Kongsrudia Lygra & Schander, 2010
 Laseronella Whitley, 1959
 Levipyrgulina Laws, 1941
 Liamorpha Pilsbry, 1898 
 Linopyrga Laws, 1941
 Menesthella Nomura, 1939
 Menestho Möller, 1842
 Miralda A. Adams, 1863
 Miraldella Bartsch, 1955
 Monotygma J. E. Gray, 1847
 Mumiola A. Adams, 1863
 Numaegilina Nomura, 1938
 Ovalina Peñas & Rolán, 2017
 Oscilla A. Adams, 1861
 Parthenina Bucquoy, Dauzenberg & Dollfus, 1883
 Perparthenina Nordsieck, 1972
 Polemicella Saurin, 1959
 Prestoniella Saurin, 1958
 Pseudoscilla Boettger, 1901
 Pukeuria Laws, 1941
 Pyrgulina A. Adams, 1863
 Quirella Laseron, 1959
 Ravnostomia Adegoke, 1977
 Salassia De Folin, 1870
 Salassiella Dall & Bartsch, 1909
 Siogamaia Nomura, 1936
 Spiralinella Chaster, 1901
 Standeniella Saurin, 1958
 Strioturbonilla Sacco, 1892
 Trabecula Monterosato, 1884
 Tragula Monterosato, 1884
 Waikura Marwick, 1931

Possible extra genera
Genera likely to reside in the subfamily Chrysallidinae include:
 Raulinia Mayer, 1864
 Rugadentia Laseron, 1951
 Stylopyramis Thiele, 1929
 Taphrostomia Cossmann, 1921

Distribution
This family is found worldwide, from the tropics to the Arctic.

Shell description
The shell of these snails has a blunt, heterostrophic protoconch, which is often  wrapped up. The texture of these shells is  sculptured in various forms such as ribs and spirals. Their color is mostly white, cream or yellowish. The teleoconch is dextrally coiled, but the larval shells are sinistral. This results in a sinistrally coiled protoconch. The columella has one, spiral fold. The aperture is closed by an operculum.

Life habits
The Chrysallidinae are ectoparasites, feeding mainly on other molluscs and on annelid worms.

They do not have a radula. Instead their long proboscis is used to pierce the skin of its prey and suck up its fluids and soft tissues. The eyes on the grooved tentacles are situated  toward the base of the tentacles. Between the head and the foot, a lobed process called the mentum ( = thin projection) is visible.

These molluscs are hermaphrodites, laying eggs in jelly-like masses on the shell of its host.

References

Pyramidellidae